Manoj Misra (born 2 June 1965) is a Judge of the Supreme Court of India. He is former Judge of the Allahabad High Court.

Career
He was graduated in law from University of Allahabad in 1988 and enrolled as an Advocate on 12 December 1988. He practised in Civil, Revenue, Criminal and Constitutional matters. He was elevated as an Additional Judge of Allahabad High Court on 21 November 2011 and was made permanent on 6 August 2013.

References 

Indian judges
1965 births
Living people
University of Allahabad alumni